Shota is a Georgian masculine given name that may refer to

Shota Abkhazava (born 1971), Georgian racing driver, race cars designer and businessman
 Shota Arveladze (born 1973), Georgian association football player
Shota Bibilov  (born 1990), Russian association football player
Shota Chochishvili (1950–2009), Georgian judoka
Shota Chomakhidze (born 1978), Georgian association football player
Shota Grigalashvili (born 1986), Georgian association football player
Shota Iatashvili (born 1966), Georgian writer, translator, and art critic
Shota Khabareli (born 1958), Georgian judoka
Shota Khinchagashvili (born 1951), Russian association football player
Shota Kveliashvili (1938–2004), Georgian Olympic shooter
Shota Kviraia (1952–2011), Georgian security and police official 
Shota Laperadze (1930–1995), Georgian film producer
Shota Lomidze (1936–1993), Georgian wrestler
Shota and Margarita Metreveli (1913-1983/84), Georgian artists
 Shota Rustaveli (1172–1216), Georgian poet of the 12th century
Shota Shamatava, Abkhazian politician
Shota Voskanyan (born 1960), Armenian artist

Georgian masculine given names